Rolandas Paksas (born 10 June 1956) is a Lithuanian politician who was the sixth President of Lithuania from 2003 to 2004. He was previously Prime Minister of Lithuania in 1999 and again from 2000 to 2001, and he also served as Mayor of Vilnius from 1997 to 1999 and again from 2000 to 2001. He led Order and Justice from 2004 to 2016 and was a Member of the European Parliament from 2009 to 2019.

A national aerobatics champion in the 1980s, after the collapse of the Soviet Union, Paksas founded a construction company, Restako. In 1997, he was elected to Vilnius City Council for the centre-right Homeland Union and became mayor. In May 1999, Paksas was appointed Prime Minister, but resigned five months later after a disagreement over privatisation. Paksas joined the Liberal Union of Lithuania (LLS) in 2000. The LLS won the 2000 election, and Paksas became PM again, but he left within seven months after another dispute over economic reforms.

In 2002, Paksas founded the Liberal Democratic Party, and ran for the presidency, winning the run-off against incumbent Valdas Adamkus in January 2003. It emerged that he had granted citizenship to a major campaign donor, leading to his impeachment and removal from office in April 2004. He was the first European head of state to have been impeached. Barred from the Seimas, Paksas was elected to the European Parliament in 2009, while leading his party, now called Order and Justice (TT). His lifetime ban from the parliament was ruled to be disproportionate measure by the European Court of Human Rights in 2011. In 2018 the amendment which would allow for Paksas to run for parliamentary seat is to be submitted. But he will not be allowed to run for president or become the speaker of the Parliament. He is considered to be the worst President of Lithuania in modern history.

Early life, education and non-political career
Paksas was born in Telšiai to Feliksas and Elena. During the Soviet era, he was known by a Russified version of his name, Rolandas Feliksovich Paksas. In 1974, he finished Zemaites High School and continued studies at the Vilnius Civil Engineering Institute (now Vilnius Gediminas Technical University). Paksas received a degree in civil engineering in 1979. In 1984, he graduated Leningrad Civil Aviation Academy. During this period, he competed in aerobatics competitions, participating in both Soviet and Lithuanian teams and winning several championships.

From 1992 to 1997, Rolandas Paksas was the President of the construction company "Restako".

Political career

Mayor of Vilnius and Prime Minister
Paksas, a former member of Communist Party of Lithuania (LKP) and its successor leftist Democratic Labour Party (LDDP) in 1995 switched his political orientation in favour of conservative right Homeland Union (Lithuanian Conservatives). In 1997 Paksas was elected to Vilnius City Council and became the Mayor of the Vilnius city municipality. Paksas also served as chairman of the Vilnius branch of the Homeland Union (Lithuanian Conservatives).

In May 1999, Vagnorius stepped down and President Valdas Adamkus asked Paksas to become the Prime Minister. The Conservatives had 68 of the Seimas' 138 seats and were part of an 81-member coalition with the Lithuanian Christian Democratic Party.

In June 1999, he became Prime Minister, heading the ninth Government after independence. Five months later, he resigned because of a disagreement over the sale of Mažeikių Nafta, a major Lithuanian oil refining company, to a US oil company. He then served as Special Assignments envoy to Adamkus.

After leaving Homeland Union Paksas joined Liberal Union of Lithuania and in April 2000, he became the Mayor of the Vilnius city municipality again. In 2000, he was elected as the Prime Minister in the eleventh Cabinet and served from November 2000 to June 2001. In March 2002, Paksas was elected as a chairman of his newly founded Liberal Democratic Party.

President of Lithuania
On 5 January 2003, he was elected President of Lithuania, after a surprise win over the incumbent Valdas Adamkus in a runoff. In the first round of elections, Paksas finished second with 19.7% of vote but, in the runoff, he gathered 54.9%. His platform included pledges to reduce poverty and income disparities, fight corruption, introduce the death penalty for drug traffickers, and move Lithuania towards a more market-based economy.

On 26 February 2003 his term as a President began. During his term, concerns arose that he had ties to the Russian mafia. Yuri Borisov, president of the aviation company Avia Baltika, had donated $400,000 to his campaign, and was given Lithuanian citizenship by Paksas' decree. This decree was later ruled to be unconstitutional by Constitutional Court of Lithuania. Paksas' connections were investigated by the State Security Department of Lithuania. In early 2004, the Seimas started impeachment proceedings against him. On 31 March 2004 the Constitutional Court of Lithuania found him guilty of violating the constitution and his oath of office. On 6 April 2004, the Parliament (Seimas) voted on three charges: that he had leaked classified information about his investigation to Borisov; that he had improperly restored Borisov's citizenship; and that he had interfered in a privatization transaction. The vote passed, effectively removing Paksas from the presidency.

Post-impeachment legal proceedings
Paksas expressed an intent to run in the June presidential election that was to replace him. In response, on 4 May the Seimas passed a constitutional amendment barring impeached persons from standing for the presidency for five years following impeachment. Following an appeal by Paksas supporters, the Constitutional Court of Lithuania ruled the amendment unconstitutional, holding instead that persons who had violated the constitution or failed to uphold their oaths of office could never again hold public offices that required an oath.

The District Court of Vilnius found Paksas not guilty of disclosing classified information (state secrets). This decision was reversed in 2005 by the Court of Appeals of the Republic of Lithuania, on the basis that the District Court had not linked all the supporting evidence. The Appeals Court, while finding Paksas guilty of a criminal act, did not impose a penalty, stating that Paksas's departure from public service meant that he no longer posed a threat.

In 2011, the European Court of Human Rights found the lifetime prohibition for Paksas to be elected to the parliament to be disproportionate and thus in violation of the European Convention on Human Rights.

In September 2018 Paksas suspended his membership in the Order and Justice party. But he will not be allowed to run for president or become the speaker of the Parliament citing that he does not want to be associated with party decisions anymore as his reason for leaving.

Personal life
Rolandas Paksas is married to Laima Paksienė and has two children; Inga and Mindaugas. He is also a former member of both Soviet and Lithuanian national aerobatic teams, and a skilled stunt pilot who currently performs around the world.

References

External links

 Homepage of Order and Justice

1956 births
Living people
Article 3 of Protocol No. 1 of the European Convention on Human Rights
European Court of Human Rights cases involving Lithuania
Grand Crosses with Golden Chain of the Order of Vytautas the Great
Impeached presidents removed from office
Mayors of Vilnius
Members of the Seimas
MEPs for Lithuania 2009–2014
MEPs for Lithuania 2014–2019
Order and Justice MEPs
Order and Justice politicians
Communist Party of Lithuania politicians
Democratic Labour Party of Lithuania politicians
Liberal Union of Lithuania politicians
Homeland Union politicians
People from Telšiai
Presidents of Lithuania
Prime Ministers of Lithuania
Vilnius Gediminas Technical University alumni
Lithuanian Air Force officers